Golovko is a gender-neutral Russian surname of Ukrainian descent. It may refer to
Aleksandr Golovko (born 1964), Russian major general
Arseniy Golovko (1906–1962), Soviet admiral
Kira Golovko (1919–2017), Russian theater and film actress

See also
 
 Holovko (surname)

Russian-language surnames